Tony Aspromourgos (born 1957-01-11) is an Australian historian of economic thought, professor at the University of Sydney and a Fellow of the Academy of the Social Sciences in Australia (ASSA). He has published several books and many articles in economic journals on different subjects concerning the history of economic thought, especially on William Petty, Richard Cantillon and Adam Smith.

Biography 
In 1978 Aspromourgos did his Bachelor of Economics at the University of Queensland. Three years later, in 1981 he became a Master of Commerce at the University of Melbourne, and in the same year he received his degree as a Master of Arts at the University of Chicago. In 1986 he obtained his Ph.D. at the University of Sydney.

Since 1978 Aspromourgos has held positions at the University of Melbourne and the University of Sydney:
 1978-1980: Tutor in Economics (University of Melbourne)
 1980: Senior Tutor in Economics (University of Melbourne)
 1985-1989: Lecturer in Economics (University of Sydney)
 1990-1997: Senior Lecturer in Economics (University of Sydney)
 1998-2005: Associate Professor of Economics (University of Sydney)
 since 2006: Professor of Economics (University of Sydney)

Work 
Apart from his specialisation in the history of economic thought, Aspromourgos also specialised in monetary economics, macro-economics and long-period theory.

His research activities were concentrated on William Petty and the origins of classical economics, on Adam Smith, on John Maynard Keynes and on the question of public debt sustainability.

Aspromourgos published in many international economic journals, including Australian Economic Papers, Oxford Economic Papers, and the Review of Political Economy. He is co-editor of the History of Economics Review and serves on the editorial board of the European Journal of the History of Economic Thought.

Aspromourgos is Secretary of ESHET, the European Society for the History of Economic Thought.

Bibliography

Books

Journal articles

References 

Historians of economic thought
20th-century Australian economists
21st-century Australian economists
Fellows of the Academy of the Social Sciences in Australia
Living people
Australian economics writers
1957 births